Eckehard Specht  is a professor in Otto von Guericke University, Magdeburg, Germany. He belongs to Institute of Fluid Dynamics and Thermodynamics (ISUT) department. His specializations are Combustion technology, heat and mass transfer, chemical process engineering, global warming, and ceramic materials.

He has obtained his PhD in Heat transfer from TU Clausthal. After that, he did the habilitation in the same university. He moved to OVG university, Magdeburg.

Background
Prof. Dr.-Ing. Eckehard Specht studied Chemical Engineering at the Technical University of Clausthal and was then Scientific Research Fellow at the Institute for Energy Engineering at the TU Clausthal (1977-1993). After his Ph.D. about the coal combustion (1984) and Habilitation in the field of high temperature process equipment (1993), he is professor from October 1, 1993 for thermodynamics and combustion at the Otto von Guericke University Magdeburg, Institute of Fluid Dynamics and Thermodynamics.

He is an appointed member of nine committees, including, the research community industrial furnaces of the Association of German Engineering Federation (VDMA), the Technical Commission of the German Ceramic Thermal Engineering Society (DKG) and the Committee of thermal processing technology by the German Iron and Steel Institute (VDEH). During his university career he was involved with a member of the Senate and Council of TU Clausthal (1983-1988), a member of the Senate of the University of Magdeburg (1994-2000) and since 1994 he is the Dean of teaching for the Faculty of Process and Systems Engineering of the Otto von Guericke University of Magdeburg.

On 14 March 2003 he was awarded the Ludwig Mond Prize from the Institution of Mechanical Engineers, England.

Research Interest
Intensive cooling of metals 
 Simulation of microstructure, stress, hardness and delay in the cooling of steel bodies of complex geometry
 Determination of heat transfer conditions for low-distortion cooling
 Measurement of local heat transfer coefficients for water sprays and air flow panels using infrared technology

Dynamic simulation of heat treatment processes in industrial furnaces, for example,
 Heat transfer and reaction paths in shaft
 Influence of the transport rollers and cross-sectional dimensions on the temperature more uniform in roller kilns
 Influencing the bed motion and heat transfer in rotary kilns

Optimization of combustion chambers
 Simulation of flow, concentration and temperature fields with combustion reaction

Measurement of thermophysical material properties to 1600 °C
 Thermal Conductivity
 Specific heat capacity
 Density and thermal expansion

Nominated Member of the Industrial Associations
	Research Association Industrial Furnaces (VDMA)
	Society of Chemical Process Engineering (ProcessNet):
       Working party of High Temperature Process Engineering
       Working party of Heat and Mass Transfer
	Scientific member and reviewer of German Industrial Research Foundation (AiF)
	Heat Technique Committee of the German Ceramics Society (DKG)
	Industrial Furnace Committee of the German Union of Ferrous Metallurgy (VdEh)
	Committee Continuous Casting of the German Society of Materials Science (DGM)
	Working Party Climate Change of the Federal State Saxony-Anhalt

PhD & Post Doc.  Guidance
He consistently maintains more than 15 PhD students. More than 20 students finished their research study successfully. In general, he likes to work with foreign students.

References

1952 births
Living people
21st-century German physicists
20th-century German physicists